Gerard  Caris (born 20 March 1925) is a Dutch sculptor and artist who has pursued a single motif throughout the course of his artistic career, the pentagon.

Early life and education  

He was born in Maastricht, the Netherlands. After attending the technical school in Maastricht he joined the marines as war volunteer trained in Camp Lejeune, N.C., United States, to end the occupation by Japan in World War II. During his training the war was ended by the atom bomb and he was sent to  the late colony of the Netherlands Indonesia. In 1947 he came back to the Netherlands, only to leave soon afterwards to the far East in an attempt to escape the poverty of his native surroundings. Ten years later he decided to emigrate to the U.S. Here he studied art and philosophy at the New York University. Combining his art classes with earning a living and visiting all art happenings, museums  and galleries, for example the Tinguely happening at the MOMA in NY in 1960 he was overwhelmed by Abstract expressionism and left for the Arabian desert in Dhofar, a sultanate of Muscat and Oman where he worked in his former trade as a petroleum  engineer. He did one more important job project, the erection of the Telstar Horn Antenna at the Andover earth station in Maine, then he traveled to California, inspired by the  movie he watched while working in the Arabian desert Strangers When We Meet. He studied at the Monterey Peninsula College, California, the Monterey Institute of Foreign Studies and San José College (arts and humanities) subsequently at the University of California, Berkeley, a.o. with David Hockney, R.B. Kitaj, Elmer Bischoff and Richard Diebenkorn  In 1967 B. A. in Philosophy, in 1969 M.A. in arts .
He returned for a “short visit” to the Netherlands where he continued his art practice without realizing there is no intellectual resonance where he works but he is so possessed with his newly discovered Pentagonism that he does not realize he has landed on the moon. 
To this day he works continually, evolving new ideas, executes them, and making them public through exhibitions and publications, remaining optimistic, believing that ha has added a new chapter to the history of art self coined as Pentagonism.

Gallery 
Studio of Gerard Caris (1983)From the collection of Stedelijk Museum Amsterdam

From the collection of  Stedelijk Van Abbemuseum, Eindhoven
From the collection of Bonnefantenmuseum, Maatricht

From the collection of Centraal Museum, Utrecht

From the collection of Peter c Ruppert

From the collection of Wilhelm-Hack Museum

From the collection of ZKM Center for Art and Media Karlsruhe

Bibliography

Catalogues 

 Gerard Caris, Exhibition catalogue, Cultureel Centrum Venlo, 1972.
 The golden section and the work of Caris (with texts by P. Huijbers, B. Lootsma, T. Prüst), Exhibition catalogue, Technical University Eindhoven, 1980.
 Frederik van der Blij, Wouter Kotte (Eds.), Gerard Caris en de vijfhoek/Gerard Caris und das Fünfeck (with texts by F. v. d. Blij, F. Boselie, P. Hartmann, W Kotte, F. Saris, K. Woensdregt), Exhibition catalogue, Museum voor Hedendaagse Kunst, Utrecht, 1987, Stadtmuseum Ratingen, 1988. 
 Measurable infinity. Constructions of the Pentagon/Meetbare oneindigheid. Constructies vanuit de vijfhoek (with texts by B. Holeczek, J. Vanbergen), Exhibition catalogue, Wilhelm-Hack-Museum, Ludwigshafen, 1991.
 Siegfried Salzmann (Ed.), Gerard Caris and the nature of art (with texts by S. Salzmann, U. Bohnen), Exhibition catalogue, Kunsthalle Bremen, 1993.
 Gerard Caris. Drawings (with texts by U. Bohnen, J. Poot), SMA. Cahiers, 8, Exhibition catalogue Stedelijk Museum, Amsterdam, 1997. .
 Gerard Caris - Kunst und Mathematik.Neue Refiexionen über das Fünfeck/Gerard Caris -Art and Mathematics.New reflections on the pentagon (with texts by U. Bohnen, R. W Gassen, H. A. Lauwerier, E. van Uitert), Exhibition catalogue, Wilhelm-Hack-Museum, Ludwigshafen, 1999. 
 Dietmar Guderian, Peter Volkwein (Eds.), Gerard Caris - Gestalten und Forschen mit dem Pentagon, Exhibition catalogue, Museum für konkrete Kunst, Ingolstadt, 2000. 
 Gerard Caris. Pentagonisme/Pentagonism (with texts by R. Fuchs, E. van Uitert, J. van de Craats, R. Salomon), SMA Cahiers, 23, Exhibition catalogue, Stedelijk Museum, Amsterdam, 2001. 
 Gregor Jansen, Peter Weibel (Eds.), Gerard Caris. Pentagonismus Pentagonism (with texts by B. Artmann, A. van den Braembussche, J. van de Craats, R. H. Dijkgraaf, H. H. Holz, S. Zeki), Verlag der Buchhandlung Walther König, Köln, 2007. 
 Ayşe Orhun Gültekin, Editor, Gerard Caris: Beşgencilik/Pentagonism (with texts by Julien Bogousslavsky, Mark A. Cheetham, Francis Halsall, Beral Madra, Laura U. Marks and John Onians), KUAD Gallery, Istanbul, Turkey, 2012
 Projecting Pentagonism: the aesthetic of Gerard Caris (with texts by Tomohiro Ishiszu, Katie McGown, John Onians and Grant Pooke) exhibition catalogue Sidney Cooper Gallery ( Canterbury Christ Church University) Canterbury, 2018

References in Books 

 Paul Haimon, Limburgse Schilders. Uitgeverij Inter Limburg, Heerlen/Hasselt. 1979. 
 Hennie v.d. Louw, 0,618, BRES 84, Stichting European, Universities Press Amsterdam 1980
 R. G. J. Ackerstaff, Goedkoper bouwen 2, Ministerie van Volkshuisvesting, Ruimtelijke Ordening en Milieubeheer. Rotterdam 1982. 
 Joop M. Joosten (Ed.), 20 jaar verzamelen, Aanwinsten Stedelijk Museum Amsterdam 1963 – 1984. Schilder- en beeldhouwkunst, Stedelijk Museum, Amsterdam, 1984.
 W.L. Boer (Ed.), Wiskunde Lijn, Jacob Dijkstra, Groningen 1990. 
 Wim Beeren (Ed.), Aanwinsten/Acquisitions 1985 - 1993, Stedelijk Museum, Amsterdam, 1993. 
 Siegfried Salzmann, Heiderose Langer (Eds.), Katalog der Neuerwerbungen und Schenkungen 
 1985 - 1993, Kunsthalle Bremen, 1993 
 Karin v. Maur (Ed.), Magie der Zahl in der Kunst des 20. Jahrhunderts, Exhibition catalogue Staatsgalerie Stuttgart, Hatje, Ostfildern-Ruit,1997. 
 Günther Meißner (Hg./ed.), Saur allgemeines Künstlerlexikon, Bd./vol. 16, Saur, München, Leipzig, 1997. 
 Academisch Ziekenhuis Maastricht (Hg./ed.), De Limburgers van het azM/Limburg artists at the azM, Maastricht, 1998. 
 Dick Bos (Hg./ed.), Moderne Wiskunde, Wolters Noordhoff, Groningen, 1999.  
Frederik van der Blij, Wiskunde met verve, Wolters Noordhoff, Groningen, 1999.  
Stedelijk Museum Amsterdam in 2001, Stedelijk Museum, Amsterdam, 2002.  
Ger Kemmerling (Ed.), DSM Art Collection, Heerlen 2002.  
Albert Van Wiemeersch, Prominenten van de beeldende kunst in de twintigste eeuw: 1901-2000 Tielt, Lannoo 2003.   
Mondriaanhuis Museum voor Constructieve en Concrete Kunst (Hg./ed.), De bomen van Pythagoras– Geconstrueerde groei (with texts by A. De Jongh-Vermeulen, A. Goddijn, / with introduction by A. Dijkxhoorn), Exhibition catalogue., Mondriaanhuis Museum voor Constructieve en Concrete Kunst, Amersfoort 2003.   
Dietmar Guderian, “Mathematics in Contemporary Arts - Finite and Infinity,” in: Michele Emmer (Hg./ed.), Mathematics and Culture, Bd. vol. II: Visual Perfection: Mathematics and Creativity,  Springer Verlag, Berlin et al., 2005.  
Jutta Laurinat, Lohn der Arbeit, Westdeutscher Künstlerbund e.V. Bochum (Hg./ed), Bochum 2005  
Dick Bos (et al.): Moderne Wiskunde, Groningen Wolters Noordhoff, 2005.  
Stedelijk Museum, Amsterdam, (Ed.), Acquisitions 1993- 2003, Amsterdam 2006.  
Marlene Lauter (Ed.), Ausgerechnet... Mathematik und Konkreter Kunst, Exhibition catalogue, Museum im Kulturspeicher Würzburg, Spurbuch, Baunach, 2007.   
Spurbuchverlag Heinz Schumann, Schulgeometrie im virtuellen Handlungsraum Hildesheim; Berlin: Franzbecker, 2007.  
Alexander van Grevenstein, Paula van den Bosch, Bonnefantenmuseum Collectie Hedendaagse Kunst, Bonnefantenmuseum, Maastricht, 2007.  
Cor Wetting (Ed.), Bridges & Passages, Sprezzatura, Leeuwarden, 2008.   
Robbert Dijkgraaf Blikwisselingen  Prometheus 2008.   
Capita selecta wiskunde, Open Universiteit Nederland, Heerlen 2009. 
Hans Heinz Holz Bild – Sprachen Gesammelte Aufsätze zu Kunst und Künstlern, Aisthesis Verlag 2009, 
Walter Nikkels, Depicted Afgebeeld Abgebildet, Valiz 2013  
Lynn Gamwell, Mathematics and Art:A Cultural History Princeton University Press 2015.  
E. Torrence, B. Torrence, C. Séquin, D. McKenna, K. Fenyvesi and R. Sarhangi : Bridges 2016, Proceedings, Cornelie Leopold Geometry and Aesthetics of Pentagonal Structures in the Art of Gerard Caris 		Tesselations Publishing, Phoenix, Arizona, USA 2016.  
John Onians, European Art A Neuroarthistory, Yale University Press 2016.   
Guido Winkler, Iemke van Dijk, Beelden in Leiden 2017 Raakvlakken. EAN /   
Peter Weibel, NEGATIVE SPACE TRAJECTORIES OF SCULPTURE Booklet of ZKM Centre for Art and Media Karlsruhe 2019

Texts & Essays 

 Leering, Jean; Beselaere, W. van: Triënnale der zuidelijke Nederlanden / Catalogue, Stedelijk Van Abbemuseum, Eindhoven 1968
 Staalkaart van de Limburgse musea en oudheidkamers / Catalogue, Bonnefantenmuseum, Maastricht,1969
 Catalogue, Musée des Beaux Arts, Antwerpen 1969
 Szénássy, István: Goden en heiligen in Limburg / Catalogue, Bonnefantenmuseum,  Maastricht 1969
 Catalogue, Raadhuis Heerlen 1969
 Blok, C.; Martinet, Jan: 50 x 50 / Catalogue, Openbaar Kunstbezit, Amsterdam 1970
 Peeters, Jan: Inleiding tentoonstelling Gerard Caris / Cultureel Centrum, Venlo 1970
 Coumans, Willem K.: Kunst in Limburg / Catalogue, Raadhuis Heerlen 1971
 Bloem, Marja: Atelier 9 / Brochure, Stedelijk Museum, Amsterdam 1971
 Holländische künstler spenden für Pakistan flüchtlinge / Catalogue, Patriotische Gesellschaft von 765, Hamburg 1971
 Eeden, Piet van dAe: Inleiding bij de tentoonstelling Gerard Caris / Cultureel Centrum  Venlo 1972
 Catalogue, Musée des Beaux Arts, Antwerpen 1973
 Becker, Wolfgang; Coumans, Willem K.: Enkel des Stijl – Künstler aus einer beschädigten Provinz auf der Suche nach einer neuen Ordnung / Catalogue, Neue Galerie Sammlung Ludwig, Aachen 1973
 Alberigs, L.M.: 36 Graphiker aus den Niederlanden / Catalogue, Dortmund e.a. 1974
 Grafika z Limburgi / Catalogue, Krakau, Listopad 1975
 Hommage à Cassel – Prix de Cassel / Catalogue, Dokumentation 2, Kassel 1977
 Grimme, Ernst Günther / Catalogue, Suermondt-Ludwig-Museum, Aachen 1979
 Grafiek uit de Benelux / Catalogue, COSA, Centre International Rogier, Bruxelles 1979
 Huijbers, P.; Lootsma, B.; Prüst, T.: De gulden snede en het werk van Caris / The golden section and the work of Caris. / Catalogue exhibition Technical University Eindhoven 1980
 Boon, S.: Inleiding bij de tentoonstelling: De gulden snede en het werk van Caris / Technische Universiteit Eindhoven, Eindhoven 1980 
 Boyens, José: Middelheim Beeldhouwkunst uit het zuiden van Nederland / Catalogue, Antwerpen 1982
 Jacob, Teun: Opdrachten /Aankopen /Catalogue, Centrum Beeldende Kunst, Rotterdam 1983
 Remkes, Ben: Formen – Zeichen – Bilder; Forms – Signs – Pictures / Catalogue, Verein für Original Radierung, München 1987
 Blij, F.v.d.; Boselie, F.; Hartman, P.; Kotte, W.; Saris, F.; Woensdregt, K.: Gerard Caris en de  vijfhoek / Catalogue tentoonstelling Museum voor Hedendaagse Kunst, Utrecht 1987
 Grevenstein, A.v.; Himmelreich, A.; Kenis, J.: PLAN, Gids-Guide Führer / Catalogue, Bonnefantenmuseum, Maastricht 1988
 Wagemans, F.: Centraal Zuid / Catalogue, Stichting Kunst en Bedrijf, Amsterdam 1988
 Hesselbein, Martin; Webb, Diane: Een musicus op bezoek bij Gerard Caris / Bonnefans Bulletin, nr. 2 (uitgave van het Bonnefantenmuseum), Maastricht 1991
 Holeczek, Bernhard; Vanbergen, Johan: Meetbare oneindigheid – Constructies vanuit de vijfhoek / Measurable infinity, Constructions of the Pentagon. Catalogue tentoonstelling Wilhelm-Hack-Museum Ludwigshafen 1991
 Salzmann, Siegfried; Bohnen, Uli: Gerard Caris en de natuur van de kunst / Gerard Caris and the nature of art. / Catalogue tentoonstelling Kunsthalle Bremen 1993
 Vanbergen, Johan: Gerard Caris en de grote vragen van vandaag, Bonnefans bulletin, nr. 3 (uitgave van het Bonnefantenmuseum) Maastricht 1993
 Blues, Guy: Building plans and schemes / Catalogue, Heusden-Zolder 1993
 Bohnen, Uli; Poot, Jurrie: Inter Dimensiones – Geest en natuur in het beeldend werk van Gerard Caris / Inter Dimensiones – Mind and Nature in the Art of Gerard Caris, Catalogue tentoonstelling Stedelijk Museum Amsterdam 1997 ( SMA Cahier 8, cat. no. 814) Bohnen, Uli; Gassen, Richard W.; Lauwerier H.A. Uitert, Evert v.: Gerard Caris – Art and Mathematics- New reflections on the pentagon.Catalogue tentoonstelling Wilhelm-Hack-Museum Ludwigshafen 1999
 Hesselbein, Martin: Caris’ Branching Oeuvre Bonnefans bulletin, nr. 3 (uitgave van het Bonnefantenmuseum) Maastricht 1999
 Guderian, Dietmar; Volkwein, Peter: Gerard Caris – Gestalten und Forschen mit dem Pentagon./ Catalogue exhibition Museum für konkrete Kunst Ingolstadt 2000
 Fuchs, Rudi; Uitert, Evert v.; Craats, Janvan de; Salomon, Ruud; Caris, Gerard: Passie en precisie De kunst van Gerard Caris / Passion and precision The Art of Gerard Caris, Catalogue tentoonstelling / Exhibition catalogue Amsterdam 2001 (SMA Cahier 23, cat. no. 860)
 Elbs, Oliver: Gerard Caris’ “Pentagonal Universe” 2009 http://www.mapology.org/en/Publications Cheetham, Mark, The Crystal Interface in Contemporary Art: Metaphors of the Organic and Inorganic LEONARDO Volume 43, Number 3, June 2010
 Onians, John, The Role of Experiential Knowledge in the Ultimate Design Studio: The Brain Journal of Research Practice Volume 6, Issue 2, Article M11, 2010

Texts by Gerard Caris 

 Een formalistische benadering – A formalistic approach –Eine formalistische Annäherung / Brochure, Neue Galerie im Alten Kurhaus, Aachen 1971
 Catalogue tentoonstelling Cultureel Centrum, Venlo 1972
 Aspecten van het creatieve proces / Catalogue, Musée des Beaus Arts, Antwerpen 1973
 Structuur, Museum voor Land- en Volkenkunde en het Instituut voor Godsdienstcommunicatie, Rotterdam 1974
 Ten geleide bij structuur 1C2 en 1C3 / Maastricht 1976 (not yet published) Meetkunde als beeldende vormgeving (Geometry as visual art) / B.B.V (=beroepsvereniging van beeldend vormgevers) bulletin 3, Amsterdam 1978
 Conjectures and Observations / Parsons School of Design, New York 1981
 Een onderzoek naar de samenhang en betekenis van Eschers werk / Bonnefans Bulletin, nr.2 (uitgave van het Bonnefantenmuseum), Maastricht 1991
 Einführung in eine pentagonale Formensprache / Wilhelm Lehmbruck Museum, Duisburg 1993
 Statement /Arthesis, Stichting ars et mathesis, Baarn 1997
 Aspects of Formalism Statement, Maastricht March 7, 2001 (not yet published)
 Statement, Maastricht 3 mei 2001 /SMA cahiers 23 2001
 Statement, Maastricht 12 november 2002 (not yet published)
 Voorstelling en betekenis Statement, Maastricht 15 november 2002 (not yet published)
 Statement, behorende bij Polyeder Net Structure # 3, Maastricht 11 december 2002 (not yet published)statement, Maastricht 12 maart 2003 (not yet published)

Newspaper, Magazine Articles and Interviews 

 Notes on the art scene/ Daily Gazette (Berkeley, California), 5.6.1968
 Dungan Cross, Miriam: Gerard Caris/ Oakland Tribune (Berkeley, California) 30.6.1968
 Polley, E.M.: Inner and outer forces are subjects of Gerard Caris‘ paintings in Berkeley/Sunday Times-Herald (Berkeley, California) 14.7.1968
 Coumans, Willem, K.: Illusionist Gerard Caris is terug in Maastricht na verblijf in Amerika/ Het Vrije Volk (Rotterdam) 23.8.1968
 Haimon, Paul: Kunstenaars geïnspireerd door de wereld/ Limburgs Dagblad (Heerlen) 26.9.1968
 Kelk, Fanny: Kunst na het olieboren/ Het Parool(Amsterdam) 6.12.1968
 Redeker, Hans: Gerard Caris- De kleine Galerij/ Algemeen Handelsblad (Amsterdam) 7.12.1968
 Wingen, Ed: De filosofie van Caris/ De Telegraaf (Amsterdam) 17.12.1968
 Kockelkoren, Jules:Hard-edge kunst is in/ De nieuwe Limburger (Maastricht) 6.3.1969
 Haimon, Paul: Gerard Caris’ filosofie/ Limburgs Dagblad (Heerlen) 26.3.1969
 Coumans, Willem K.: Triënnale der zuidelijke Nederlanden in Eindhoven/ Het Vrije Volk (Rotterdam) 12.4.1969
 Haimon, Paul: Triënnale der zuidelijke Nederlanden in Eindhoven/Limburgs Dagblad (Heerlen) 23.4.1969
 Laan, Adri: Triënnale Van Abbemuseum/De Gelderlander (Nijmegen) 5.5.1969
 Duister, Frans: “Musement,” democratische museumstad voor iedereen/ De Tijd (Amsterdam) 19.6.1969
 Kockelkoren, Jules: Gerard Caris, kunstenaar, filosoof/ De Nieuwe Limburger (Maastricht) 20.11.1969
 Nooteboom, Urias: Gerard Caris op zoek naar oerstructuur/ Limburgs Dagblad (Heerlen) 26.11.1969
 Tummers, Nic.H.M.: Gerard Caris: Boren naar olie en in de ruimte/ Cobouw (Den Haag) 6.12.1969
 De Bruijn, Walter: De mathematische kunst van Gerard Caris of het reiken naar het absolute/ Dagblad voor Noord-Limburg (Venlo) 17.1.1970
 Kelk, Fanny: Vijfhoeken/ Het Parool (Amsterdam) 6.2.1970
 Dohmen, Ber: Gerard Caris lanceert idee voor museumbouw/ Limburgs Dagblad (Heerlen) 3.9.1970
 De Smet, Yves: Het tonaal constructivisme van Bullens, van Doorslaer en Wery/Plus-kern (Gent) 15.1.1971
 Strenske, Petra: Bilder von strenger Schönheit. Gerard Caris stellt aus im Studio der Neuen Galerie Aachen/ Aachener Nachrichten (Aachen) 2.7.1971
 Richter, Wolfgang: Neue Galerie Aachen: Form als Grundelement der Schöpfung. Vierte Studio-Ausstellung mit Bildern und Grafiken von Gerard Caris/ Aachener Volkszeitung (Aachen) 2.7.1971
 Haimon, Paul: Gerard Caris exposeert in Neue Galerie in Aken/Limburgs Dagblad (Heerlen), 23.7.1971
 Tummers, Nic, H.M.: Gerard Caris in de Neue Galerie in Aken/ Cobouw, Dagblad voor de bouwwereld (Den Haag) 6.8.1971
 Kelk, Fanny: Stedelijk Museum. Atelier 9 tot 8 november 13 jonge kunstenaars/Het Parool (Amsterdam) 29.10.1971
 Kockelkoren, Jules: Vrieslucht van het absolute/ De Limburger (Maastricht) 24.6.1972
 De Bruijn, Walter: Het „eigen“ heelal van Gerard Caris/ Dagblad voor Noord-Limburg (Venlo) 1.7.1972
 Haimon, Paul: Kunstenaars van de geometrie in Venlo/ Limburgs Dagblad (Heerlen) 15.7.1972
 Wingen, Ed: Actuele kunstmarkt in Düsseldorf bewijst: Constructivisten zijn bijzonder populair/ De Telegraaf (Amsterdam) 12.10.1972
 Bosetti, Petra: Kunst aus Nachbarland/Aachener Volkszeitung (Aachen) 14.4.1973
 Richter, Wolfgang: Die sozialen Konsequenzen der Kunst/ Aachener  Volkszeitung (Aachen) 14.4.1973
 Coumans, Willem K.: Nieuwe kunst uit Limburg in Aken. Limburgse kunstenaars stellen orde op zaken/ De Limburger (Maastricht) 28.4.1973
 Wingen, Ed: De kleinkinderen van de Stijl/ De Telegraaf (Amsterdam) 10.5.1973
 Wingen, Ed: Van Hulsen: Toekomst voor constructivisme/ De Telegraaf (Amsterdam) 3.10.1974
 Redeker, Hans: Gerard Caris/ N.R.C.Handelsblad (Rotterdam) 10.1.1975
 De Bruijn, Walter: Het „eigen“ heelal van Gerard Caris/ Dagblad voor Noord-Limburg (Venlo) 1.7.1972
 Haimon, Paul: Kunstenaars van de geometrie in Venlo/ Limburgs Dagblad (Heerlen) 15.7.1972
 Wingen, Ed: Actuele kunstmarkt in Düsseldorf bewijst: Constructivisten zijn bijzonder populair/ De Telegraaf (Amsterdam) 12.10.1972
 Bosetti, Petra: Kunst aus Nachbarland/Aachener Volkszeitung (Aachen) 14.4.1973
 Richter, Wolfgang: Die sozialen Konsequenzen der Kunst/ Aachener  Volkszeitung (Aachen) 14.4.1973
 Coumans, Willem K.: Nieuwe kunst uit Limburg in Aken. Limburgse kunstenaars stellen orde op zaken/ De Limburger (Maastricht) 28.4.1973
 Wingen, Ed: De kleinkinderen van de Stijl/ De Telegraaf (Amsterdam) 10.5.1973
 Wingen, Ed: Van Hulsen: Toekomst voor constructivisme/ De Telegraaf (Amsterdam) 3.10.1974
 Redeker, Hans: Gerard Caris/ N.R.C.Handelsblad (Rotterdam) 10.1.1975
 Redeker, Hans: Stad Maastricht toont ons zijn moderne kunst/N.R.C.Handelsblad (Rotterdam) 8.8.1975
 Van Gijzel, J.: Vrijheid is niets meer dan wat je in je zak hebt/ Het Vrije Volk (Rotterdam) 26.5.1977
 Kusters, Sjef: De vijfhoek verklaart ons heelal/ De Limburger (Maastricht) 28.6.1977
 Haimon, Paul:Monumentaal kunstwerk siert centrum Vijverdal/ Limburgs Dagblad (Heerlen) 11.7.1977
 Bosetti, Petra: Der Reiz des Spröden/Aachener Nachrichten (Aachen) 26.11.1977
 Welling, Dolf: Kunst onder Prins Bernhardviaduct/Haagse Courant (Den Haag), 12.12.1977
 Van Ginneken, Lily: Kunstenaar kan leren omgaan met kunststof/ De Volkskrant (Amsterdam) 28.12.1977
 Doele, Sikke & Touwen, Marius: Caris‘ merkwaardige vijfhoeken/Leeuwarder Courant (Leeuwarden) 29.9.1978
 Leeuw, R. A.: Het leven voor de vijfhoek/Scheppend Ambacht, COSA (Delft)30-e jaargangnr.1, Feb.1979
 V.d. Louw, Hennie: Gulden Snede van Caris/ De Nieuwe Linie (Amsterdam) 26.3.1980
 Vastrick, Waldy: Gerard Caris in T.H. Eindhoven/ Eindhovens Dagblad (Eindhoven) 28.3.1980
 Kusters, Sjef: De vijfhoekige wereld van Gerard Caris/ De Limburger (Maastricht) 28.3.1980
 Juffermans, Jan: Vijfhoeken/ Algemeen Dagblad (Rotterdam) 2.4.1980
 Gerard Caris und der Goldene Schnitt/ Aachener Volkszeitung (Aachen) 10.4.1980
 Juffermans, Jan: Vijfhoeken van Gerard Caris/ Hervormd Nederland (Rotterdam) 19.4.1980 
 Ginjaar, Aloys: De rechthoek maakt square/ Nieuwsnet (Amsterdam) 26.4.1980
 V.d. Louw, Hennie: Delft Expositie T.H./ Kunstbeeld (Amsterdam) mei 1980
 V.d. Waals, J.C.: Afiguratieven en een verhalend figuratief/ Het Financiële Dagblad (Amsterdam) 9.5.1980
 Rozendaal, Simon: De Goddelijke Verhouding/ N.R.C.Handelsblad (Rotterdam) 10.5.1980
 Straus, Cees: Een nieuwe kijk op omgevingskunst/ Trouw (Amsterdam) 17.5.1980
 Hoffberg, Judith A.: The golden section and the work of Caris/ Umbrella, volume 4, number 3, (New York) may 1981
 Verwiel, H.J.: Gerard Caris ontwerpt 12-vlakkenhuis/ Scheppend Ambacht, COSA (Delft) 33-e jaargang, nr.3, Juni 1982
 Kusters, Sjef: Beeldhouwkunst uit het Zuiden van Nederland in Antwerps beeldenpark Middelheim/ De Limburger (Maastricht) 15.6.1982
 Vastrick, Waldy: Vijfhoeken als uitgangspunt /Eindhovens Dagblad (Eindhoven) 3.7.1982
 Laureys, Peter: Z.-Nederlanders veroveren Middelheim/ De Neus, Stadskrant van Groot-Antwerpen, juli-aug.1982
 Gillemon, Danièle: Des sculpteurs hollandais du sud au parc du Middelheim, à Anvers/Le Soir (Brussel) 2.8.1982
 Richter, Wolfgang: Die fünfeckige Welt des Gerard Caris/ Aachener Volkzeitung (Aachen) 21.8.1982
 V.d.Louw, Hennie: Caris‘ vijfhoekige huisjes/ Het Parool (Amsterdam) 28.8.1982
 Blij, F.v.d.: Ein Mathematiker betrachtet bildende Kunst/ Das Fünfeck/Mathematik lehren (Seelze), Heft 23, Aug. 1987
 Craats, Jan van de: Dodecaëder en vijfhoek/ N.R.C.Handelsblad (Rotterdam) 1.12.1987
 Stiemer, Flora: De macht van het perspectief/ Algemeen Dagblad (Amsterdam) 19.12.1987
 Souren, Marlies: Vijfhoek als kosmisch gegeven in het werk van Caris/Utrechts Nieuwsblad/ NZC(Utrecht) 24.12.1987
 Wittebrood, Nico: Het verboden kristal/Kijk (Haarlem) Januari 1988
 Vondermark, Dirk: Keine Energie für die schon existierende Formen/Düsseldorfer Nachrichten (Düsseldorf) 18.1.1988
 Esser, Ulrike B.: Gerard Caris und das Fünfeck/ Ratinger Wochenblatt (Ratingen) 18.1.1988
 Wingen, Ed: In de ban van de vijfhoek/Kunstbeeld (Amsterdam) Februari 1988
 Defesche, Pieter: „Dominicanenkerk model van goddelijk plan“Metafysisch voertuig voor Euregionale/ Limburgs Dagblad (Heerlen) 12.11.1988
 Van een gestrand ruimteschip tot vuursteen, vijfhoek en mail-art/ Het nieuwsblad (België) 19.11.1988
 Calmthout, Martijn van: Quasi-kristal geeft informatie over wereld met extra dimensie/Volkskrant (Amsterdam) 5.5.1990
 Vastrick, Waldy: Gerard Caris, veelzijdig kunstenaar/ Bijvoorbeeld nr.3 (Mijdrecht) 1990
 Arend, Heike: Die Entdeckung des Fünfeck/ Rheinpfalz (Ludwigshafen) 11.6.1991
 Loimeier, Manfred: Nieder mit den Vierecken/ Mannheimer Morgen (Mannheim) 11.6.1991
 Red: Meßbare Unendlichkeit/Wochenblatt (Ludwigshafen) 13.6.1991
 Meßbare Unendlichkeit/ Künstlerpost nr.7 (Ludwigshafen) Juni 1991
 Wingen, Ed: De vijfhoek van het artistieke denken/ Kunstbeeld (Amsterdam) Juni 1991
 Heiderich, Günter: Fünfeck als Form und Symbol/ Weser Kurier (Bremen) 7.9.1993
 Beßling, Rainer: Raum frei für das Fünfeck/Kreiszeitung Syke (Bremen) 9.9.1993
 Rummel, Ralf: Von Figur des Fünfecks fasziniert/ Nordwest Zeitung (Bremen) 29.9.1993
 Baan, Raymond: Het verboden kristal/Kunstbeeld (Amsterdam) Oktober 1993
 Beek, Willem v.: Gerard Caris en de eenheid in de schepping/ Kunstbeeld (Amsterdam) Oktober 1997
 Delft, Dirk v.: Een vijftallig universum/N.R.C.Handelsblad (Rotterdam) 22.10.1997
 Kagie, Rudie: Driedimensionale vijfhoek/Vrij Nederland (Amsterdam) 27.3.1999
 Augustijn, Piet: Driedimensionale vijfhoek: Het levenswerk van Gerard Caris/Beelden nr.2 - Dutch sculptors‘ association -driemaandelijks bulletin over beeldhouwkunst. (Rotterdam) ünfeck und seinen Möglichkeiten -Das Wilhelm- Hack-Museum in Ludwigshafen zeigt den niederländischen Künstler Gerard Caris/ Rheinpfalz (Ludwigshafen) 9.9.1999
 Wappler, Dietrich: Vom Fünfeck und seinen Möglichkeiten -Das Wilhelm-Hack-Museum in Ludwigshafen zeigt den niederländischen Künstler Gerard Caris/ Rheinpfalz (Ludwigshafen) 9.9.1999
 Heybrock, Christel: Sogar nachts träumt dieser Mann vom Fünfeck-Ausstellung: Der Holländer Gerard Caris wieder zu Gast im Hack-Museum Ludwigshafen/ Mannheimer Morgen (Mannheim) 9.9.1999
 Delft, Dirk v.: Het pakkende pentagon - Gerard Caris verkent grensgebied tussen kunst en wetenschap/ NRC Handelsblad (Rotterdam) 2.10.1999
 Straus, Cees: Hoe eigenzinnig is het gedrag van de vijfhoek/ Trouw (Amsterdam) 19.7.2000
 Beek, Willem v.: De gelijktijdigheid van helderheid en complexiteit / Kunstbeeld (Amsterdam) Oktober 2000
 Keune, Pieter: De kwintessens van het pentagon Onregelmatige herhaling bij Gerard Caris /KM vakinformatie voor beeldend kunstenaars en restauratoren(Amsterdam) najaar 2000
 Seidler, Uli: Wenn Kunst Gerard Caris: Wenn Kunst, Mathematik und Technik verschmelzen – Eine Ausstellung in der Theatergalerie zeigt Gerard Caris’ Pentagonforschungen/ Donaukurier (Ingolstadt) 25.09.2000
 Duking, Karen: Pentagon van Caris/ Dagblad De Limburger (Maastricht) 11.10.2001
 Romijn, Catharien: Constructivist Gerard Caris exposeert in Stedelijk Museum Amsterdam -Passie voor de vijfhoek/ Limburgs Dagblad (Heerlen) 13.10.2001
 Craats, Jan van de: Een pentagonale microcosmos / Nieuw Archief voor Wiskunde, uitgave van het Wiskundig Genootschap (Leiden) vijfde serie, deel 2, nummer 3, september 2001
 Craats, Jan van de: Geheimen van de vijfhoek / Pythagoras (Leiden) 41e jaargang nummer 1, oktober 2001
 Siepe, Leo: Een levenlang, radiouitzending AM 747 (Art as Life Radio broadcast AM 747) October 2, 2003
 Harle, Rob Book reviews in LEONARDO 2008: Gerard Caris: Pentagonismus/Pentagonism 2007, Gerard Caris: Art and Mathematics. New Reflections on the Pentagon. 1999, Tekeningen / Drawings S M 		A Cahiers 8 1997, Pentagonisme / Pentagonism. S M A Cahiers 23 2001 http://leonardo.info/reviews/jan2008/gerard_harle.html  Friesland, Max van: Interview Gerard Caris July 2008 https://www.youtube.com/watch?v=KRL2JvrJe7E
 Mark A. Cheetham, The Crystal Interface in Contemporary Art: Metaphors of the Organic and Inorganic LEONARDO, Vol. 43, No3, pp. 250–255, 2010
 John Onians, “The Role of Experiential Knowledge in the Ultimate Design Studio: The Brain” Journal of Research Practice, Volume 6, Issue 2, Article M11, 2010    http://jrp.icaap.org/index.php/jrp/article/viewArticle/240/201
 Journal of Comparative Literature and Aesthetics, Volume : XXXV : Nos. 1-2 : 2012, A Symposium on the Art of Gerard Caris ISSN : 0252-8169
 Foreign artists praise Persian artworks / Tehran Times Art Desk Tehran, February 15, 2011
 Pentagonism, KUAD Gallery, Time out Istanbul September 2012, p. 70
 Artist Talk // Gerard Caris & Beral Madra An interview with Gerard Caris on art, science and his solo exhibition, “Pentagonism”. 18 September 2012 Interview organized on the occasion of Gerard Caris’s solo exhibition, “Pentagonism” at Kuad Gallery. Artist: Gerard Caris Kuad Gallery   kuadgallery.com http://vimeo.com/56246248
 Harle, Rob Book review in LEONARDO 2012: Gerard Caris: Beşgencilik/Pentagonism by Ayşe Orhun Gültekin, Editor Kuad Gallery, Süleyman Seba Caddesi, Beşiktaş, Istanbul 2012 128 pp., illus. colour & b/w.  Paper, http://leonardo.info/reviews/dec2012/gultekin-harle.php

 Gerard Caris Pentagonismus/Pentagonism.Verlag der Buchhandlung Walther König, Köln, ZKM | Museum für neue Kunst Karlsruhe 2007

References

External links 
 
 
 
 
 Website for art historical Documentation

1925 births
Living people
Artists from Maastricht
Dutch male sculptors
Dutch sculptors
University of California, Berkeley alumni
Royal Netherlands Marine Corps personnel of World War II